The Würm is a river of Baden-Württemberg, southwestern Germany. It is a right tributary of the river Nagold, south of Pforzheim, only 2 kilometers before the Nagold discharges into the Enz.

References

Rivers of Baden-Württemberg
Schönbuch
Rivers of Germany